The Charles River Bridge is a pair of railroad single-leaf, through-truss, rolling bascule bridges across the Charles River that connects North Station in Boston, Massachusetts to MBTA Commuter Rail lines in northern Massachusetts, United States.

History

Although rail bridges across the Charles River near the present location of North Station have existed since the Boston and Lowell Railroad opened in 1835, the current bridges date from 1931, when the navigable channel of the Charles River was shifted 300 feet to the north of its former route to allow the platforms at North Station to be extended northwards. The bridges were formerly connected to North Station by a wooden trestle; the trestle burned in January 1984, forcing all trains to terminate at a temporary station north of the river for 15 months.

Design and construction
These bridges were designed by Keller & Harrington of Chicago, Illinois, and built by the Phoenix Bridge Company of Phoenixville, Pennsylvania. Originally, there were four bridges, but only two of them remain.

See also
List of bridges documented by the Historic American Engineering Record in Massachusetts
List of crossings of the Charles River

References

External links

Historic American Engineering Record in Massachusetts
MBTA Commuter Rail
Transportation in Cambridge, Massachusetts
Railroad bridges in Massachusetts
Truss bridges in the United States
Buildings and structures in Cambridge, Massachusetts
Bridges in Middlesex County, Massachusetts
Bridges over the Charles River
Steel bridges in the United States
Bascule bridges in the United States